Howard Clewes (27 October 1912 – 29 January 1988) was an English screenwriter and novelist. He wrote for eight films between 1951 and 1974. He also wrote twenty action novels from 1938 to 1979. He was nominated for a BAFTA for Best Screenplay in 1960 for The Day They Robbed the Bank of England.

He was born in York, England. In 1946, he married Renata Faccincani della Torre, a wartime resistance fighter. She was an active (uncredited) editor in his literary and screenwriting projects.

Filmography
 Green Grow the Rushes (1951), based on his 1949 novel of the same name

 The Long Memory (1953), based on his 1951 novel of the same name
 The Steel Bayonet (1957)
 The One That Got Away (1957)
 The Day They Robbed the Bank of England (1960)
 Up from the Beach (1965)
 That Man in Istanbul (1965)
 The Three Musketeers (1974)

Novels

 Sailor Comes Home (1938)
 Dead Ground (1946)
 The Unforgiven (1947)
  Thus am I Slayn (1948)  
 The Mask Of Wisdom (1949)
 Green Grow the Rushes (1949)
 The Long Memory (1951)
 An Epitaph For Love (1953)
 The Way The Wind Blows (1954)
 Man On A Horse (1964)
 The Libertines (1966)
 I, The King (1979)

Play

Image in the sun (1955)

References

External links

1912 births
1988 deaths
English male screenwriters
People from York
20th-century English screenwriters
20th-century English male writers